A Texas Steer is a lost 1927 American silent film directed by Richard Wallace and starring Will Rogers. It was a cinematic adaptation from an eponymous play by Charles H. Hoyt.

Plot summary
Maverick Brander, a newly elected Congressman from the fictional town of Red Dog, Texas, moves to Washington, D.C. to serve in the United States House of Representatives. He supports the Eagle Rock Dam bill. Meanwhile, he flirts with a woman.

Cast
Will Rogers as Cattle Brander
Louise Fazenda as Mrs. Ma Brander
Sam Hardy as Brassy Gall
Ann Rork as Bossy Brander
Douglas Fairbanks, Jr. as Farleigh Bright
Lilyan Tashman as Dixie Style 
George F. Marion as Fishback
Bud Jamison as Othello (as Bud Jamieson)
Arthur Hoyt as Knott Innitt
Mack Swain as Bragg
William Orlamond as Blow
Lucien Littlefield as Yell

Critical reception
The film was reviewed in The New York Times by film critic Mordaunt Hall in 1928. He noted, "There are passages in this film that are rowdy, but there are also a good many witty episodes."

References

External links

Turner Classic Movies
Still with Louise Fazenda, Ann Rork, and Will Rogers at gettyimages.com

1927 films
American silent feature films
American black-and-white films
Films set in Texas
Films set in Washington, D.C.
Lost American films
1927 comedy films
First National Pictures films
Silent American comedy films
1927 lost films
1920s English-language films
Films directed by Richard Wallace
1920s American films